Oligolepis is a genus of fish in the goby family Gobiidae, native to marine, fresh and brackish waters of the coastal areas of the Indian Ocean and the western Pacific Ocean.

Species
There are currently 6 recognized species in this genus:
 Oligolepis acutipennis (Valenciennes, 1837) (Sharptail goby)
 Oligolepis cylindriceps (Hora, 1923)
 Oligolepis dasi (Talwar, Chatterjee & Dev Roy, 1982)
 Oligolepis jaarmani (M. C. W. Weber, 1913)
 Oligolepis keiensis (J.L.B. Smith, 1938) (Kei goby) 
 Oligolepis stomias (H. M. Smith, 1941)

The genera Oligolepis and Oxyurichthys were rearranged by Larsson and Pezold in 2015 and O. keiensis was moved to Oxyurichthys while two other species Oligolepis formosanus and Oligolepis nijsseni were added to this genus.

References

 
Gobionellinae
Taxonomy articles created by Polbot